Alyssa Lim (born 23 January 1991) is a female badminton player from England.

Achievements

BWF International Challenge/Series
Women's Doubles

Mixed Doubles

 BWF International Challenge tournament
 BWF International Series tournament

References

External links
 

1991 births
Living people
People from Milton Keynes
English female badminton players
Sportspeople from Buckinghamshire